is a passenger railway station located in the town of Nagatoro, Saitama, Japan, operated by the private railway operator Chichibu Railway.

Lines

Station layout

The station is staffed and consists of a single island platform serving two tracks, with an additional bidirectional track adjacent to track 2 for use by freight services.

Platforms

Adjacent stations

History
Higuchi Station opened on 14 September 1911.

Passenger statistics
In fiscal 2018, the station was used by an average of 242 passengers daily.

Surrounding area
 Arakawa River

References

External links

 Higuchi Station information (Saitama Prefectural Government) 
 Higuchi Station timetable 

Railway stations in Japan opened in 1911
Railway stations in Saitama Prefecture
Nagatoro, Saitama